Un Lujo (stylized as Un Lu*Jo) is a collaborative Studio album released by Mexican recording artists Lucero and Joan Sebastian, which was released on 22 May 2012, by Skalona Records. Sebastian wrote and produced all tracks included, four performed by him, four songs by Lucero and three duets recorded by both.

Un Lujo debuted in the top five in the Billboard Top Latin Albums in the United States and within the top forty in Mexico. The lead album single – the duet "Caminar Contigo" – went on to chart in the top twenty of the Billboard Latin Songs and the second single, "Diséñame", performed by Sebastian also charted in Mexico and the United States. The album was nominated for a 2013 Billboard Mexican Music Award.

Background
Mexican singer Lucero and fellow Mexican singer-songwriter Joan Sebastian were both signed to the same record label (Musart Records) during the 80s, and Lucero recorded songs written by Sebastian on her albums Fuego y Ternura (1985) and Lucerito: Ocho Quince (1988). In 1992, Lucero included on her album Lucero De México Sebastian's song "Llorar" ("Cry") and was released as the lead single from the album reaching top thirty in the Billboard Latin Songs. In 2010, Lucero starred in the telenovela Soy Tu Dueña and was joined by Sebastian on the theme song titled "Golondrinas Viajeras" ("Traveler Swallows") which was later included on Sebastian's album Huevos Rancheros (2011).

Recording and release
While shooting the telenovela Por Ella Soy Eva in March 2012, Lucero recorded and released "No Me Dejes Ir" ("Don't Let Me Go"), a song that was to be included on the soundtrack, and also revealed that she was still working on a new album to be titled Lujo produced by Joan Sebastian. Two months later the album title was announced as Un LuJo, using the first two letters of the names of both singers. Un Lujo includes four songs recorded by each performer individually and three duets. The song "Diséñame" ("Design Me") was presented by Sebastian at the Festival Acapulco 2012. Sebastian stated that the album is "a representation of the love and admiration we have for each other".

Singles
The duet "Caminar Contigo" ("Walk with You") was selected as the album lead single and peaked at number 18 in the Billboard Latin Songs and at number seven in the Regional Mexican Songs chart in the United States. "Diséñame", performed by Sebastian, was released as the second single, peaking at number 13 in the Regional Mexican Songs chart. In Mexico, the song peaked at number 10 on the Top General in the Monitor Latino charts and number 3 in the Mexican Airplay Chart according to Billboard International chart.

Track listing
All songs written by Joan Sebastian.

Chart performance
In the United States, Un Lujo debuted and peaked at number four in the Billboard Top Latin Albums, and reached the top of the Regional Mexican Albums chart in the second week. The album peaked at number 24 in Mexican Album Charts, lower than the previous releases by both performers, Indispensable by Lucero (#16) and Huevos Rancheros by Sebastian (#8). Un Lujo was nominated for Ranchero/Mariachi Album of the Year at the 2013 Billboard Mexican Music Awards.

Weekly charts

Year-end charts

References

2012 albums
Lucero (entertainer) albums
Joan Sebastian albums
Spanish-language albums
Collaborative albums
Albums produced by Joan Sebastian